Altheim is a town in western Austria. It is situated within the District of Braunau am Inn in the traditional region of Innviertel in the state of Upper Austria. It lies on the small river known as the Mühlheimer Ache, a tributary of the River Inn.

Population

Villages

Altheim
Diepolding
Englwertsham
Gallenberg
Gaugsham
Kling
Lehen
Lüfteneck
Mauernberg
Schwaig
Stern
Wagham
Weidenthal
Weirading
Wolfegg

Sights
In 1985 archaeologists discovered the ruins of a Roman villa in farmland just outside Altheim. In the town there is a Roman museum dedicated to these findings, the Ochzethaus.

See also
 Braunau am Inn
 Linz
 Upper Austria

References

External links 

 Town hall website
 Altheim TV

Cities and towns in Braunau am Inn District